Chaetostoma anomalum is a species of catfish in the family Loricariidae. It is native to South America, where it occurs in the basins of Lake Maracaibo, the Chama River, the Capazon River, and the Escalante River in Venezuela. The species reaches 16 cm (6.3 inches) in total length.

References 

anomalum
Fish of Venezuela
Fish described in 1903
Catfish of South America